Trucost is a company which makes estimates about the hidden costs of unsustainable use of natural resources by companies. Trucost has been founded in 2000 and has its head office in London. For the United Nations Environment Programme Finance Initiative (UNEP FI) Trucost estimated the cost of environmental damage by the 3000 largest public listed companies US$ 2.15 trillion.
S&P Dow Jones Indices acquired 1 October 2016 a controlling stake in Trucost.

See also
Full cost accounting

Sources

 Trucost website
 BBC, 12 October 2010: Nature's sting: The real cost of damaging Planet Earth

Companies based in the London Borough of Tower Hamlets
United Nations Environment Programme